is a Japanese actor.

Biography
Taguchi was born in Saitama Prefecture. His mother was a big fan of Masaharu Fukuyama. When Taguchi was four years old, while he was not aware, his mother applied and recruited for Amuse's Amuse Kids (a child department) in which the agency belonged to Fukuyama and became affiliated.

His first main role on TV is Kotaro Sakuma/Koguma Sky Blue on Uchu Sentai Kyuranger in 2017.

On March 31, 2020, due to the Taguchi's contract expiration, he left the agency.

Personal life
Because he was closely watching Kamen Rider Den-O, Taguchi liked Takeru Satoh and belonged to Amuse.

Director Yukihiko Tsutsumi commented that "when I said 'Do it like this,' I will do as it is, so I thought 'perhaps it is over 30 years old.'"

In Uchuu Sentai Kyuuranger, he doesn't know that he got the hero role because he ignored the audition requirements, and thought he was just a guest on his first appearance. The staff cast of this work also highly appreciate Taguchi's acting skills and attitude towards work.

Filmography

Films

Television dramas

Internet dramas

Audio dramas

Music videos

Advertisements

Magazines

Discography
"Blue Sky Boy" (2017) was sung by Taguchi under the name of his character Kotaro Sakuma/Koguma Sky Blue.

References

External links
  

2004 births
21st-century Japanese singers
21st-century Japanese male singers
Actors from Saitama Prefecture
Japanese male child actors
Living people